TNA One Night Only (2014) is a series of professional wrestling One Night Only events held by Total Nonstop Action Wrestling (TNA) in 2014.

Tag Team Tournament

One Night Only: Tag Team Tournament was a professional wrestling pay-per-view (PPV) event produced by Total Nonstop Action Wrestling (TNA). TNA held a series of matches featuring various TNA tag teams, where the winners of these matches would advance farther in the tournament with the winners being crowned the "Best TNA Tag Team." It took place on March 18, 2013, from the Impact Zone in Orlando, Florida and aired on PPV on January 3, 2014.

 Tournament bracket

Hardcore Justice 3

One Night Only: Hardcore Justice 3 was a professional wrestling pay-per-view (PPV) event produced by Total Nonstop Action Wrestling (TNA). TNA goes hardcore for one night only where every match is contested under hardcore wrestling stipulations. It took place on December 29, 2013, from the Lowell Auditorium in Lowell, Massachusetts and aired on PPV on January 10, 2014.

#OldSchool

One Night Only: #OldSchool took place on December 30, 2013, from the Mid-Hudson Civic Center in Poughkeepsie, New York and aired on PPV on February 7, 2014.

Joker's Wild 2

One Night Only: Joker's Wild 2 was made up of tag team matches in which the partners were randomly drawn in a lottery and teams had to work together to advance to the main event battle royal, with the grand prize of US$100,000. It took  place on February 2, 2014, from the National Indoor Arena in Birmingham, England and aired on PPV on May 9, 2014.

 Gauntlet battle royal

 Six Knockout elimination tag team match

Global Impact Japan

One Night Only: Global Impact Japan was a TNA / Wrestle-1 supershow in Tokyo, Japan. The TNA World Heavyweight, X Division and World Tag Team Championships were all defended during the event. The event also featured several matches not involving TNA wrestlers, dubbed "Part 1." Below are matches taped for the One Night Only PPV from "Part 2," which aired on PPV on July 4, 2014. Also aired on the One Night Only PPV was a 6-man tag team match originally aired at Lockdown (2014).

 1. This match was originally aired at the Lockdown (2014) PPV.

X-Travaganza 2014

One Night Only: X-Travaganza 2014 honored and paid tribute to the X-Division as the past, present, and future X-Division stars collided. During the event, 6 non-roster X Division wrestlers competed in singles matches against 6 members of the active roster: if they would win, they would move on to compete in an Ultimate X match where the winner of that match would earn a future TNA X Division Championship match. It took place on April 12, 2014, from the Impact Zone in Orlando, Florida, and aired on PPV on August 1, 2014.

World Cup 2014

One Night Only: World Cup 2014 included teams of wrestlers and Knockouts led by a team captain who would compete in singles, tag team and Knockouts matches. The team that gain the most points qualify to the final match to fight for TNA World Cup. It took place on April 12, 2014, from the Impact Zone in Orlando, Florida, and aired on PPV on September 5, 2014.

Teams and members
.

 Team Young
 Eric Young (Captain)
 Bully Ray
 Eddie Edwards
 Gunner
 ODB

 Team Angle
 Kurt Angle (Captain)
 Davey Richards
 Mr. Anderson
 Sanada
 Madison Rayne

 Team EC3
 Ethan Carter III (Captain)
 Jessie Godderz
 Robbie E
 Magnus
 Gail Kim

 Team Roode
 Bobby Roode (Captain)
 James Storm
 Kenny King
 Samuel Shaw
 Angelina Love

 Points

 Ten-person elimination tag team match

Knockouts Knockdown 2014

One Night Only: Knockouts Knockdown 2014 held a series of matches featuring eight TNA Knockouts taking on eight independent women's wrestlers. The winner of these matches would advance to the main event, a Knockouts Gauntlet match to crown the "Queen of the Knockouts." It took place on May 10, 2014, from the Impact Zone in Orlando, Florida, and aired on PPV on November 7, 2014.

 Gauntlet Battle Royal

Victory Road

One Night Only: Victory Road  was a professional wrestling pay-per-view (PPV) event produced by Total Nonstop Action Wrestling (TNA). The event included a series of matches featuring various TNA wrestlers, where the winner of these matches would advance to the main event, a gauntlet battle royal match with the winner getting a future shot at the TNA World Heavyweight Championship. It took place on May 10, 2014, from the Impact Zone in Orlando, Florida, and aired on PPV on December 5, 2014.

 Gauntlet Battle Royal

References

2014 in professional wrestling
2014
Professional wrestling in Orlando, Florida
Professional wrestling in Massachusetts
Professional wrestling in New York (state)
Professional wrestling in England
Events in Orlando, Florida
Events in Massachusetts
Events in New York (state)
Events in Birmingham, West Midlands
Events in Tokyo
2014 in professional wrestling in Florida
2014 in Massachusetts
Events in Poughkeepsie, New York
2014 in England
2014 in Japan
Professional wrestling in Tokyo